Motori Moderni was a Formula One engine manufacturer from 1985 through 1987. It was established by the experienced Italian engine designer Carlo Chiti.

Chiti, a former Alfa Romeo Formula One chief engineer, formed Motori Moderni to make turbocharged V6 engines for Minardi, known as the Tipo 615-90.

V6 Turbo

1985
Their debut was at the 1985 San Marino Grand Prix where Pierluigi Martini impressed the F1 community using the new engine to put the grossly overweight (+ compared to other turbo cars at around ) M185 19th on the grid. From all reports of that first race meeting, the only problem with the Motori Moderni was a broken fuel pump belt in practice.

Martini failed to score a point in 1985 with a best finish of 8th and last in the season ending Australian Grand Prix and it was generally accepted that Martini was not yet up to F1 standard. Also, at the three fastest circuits on the calendar, the Motori Moderni powered Minardi was hopelessly outclassed. At Silverstone for the British Grand Prix, Martini was 8.054 seconds slower than Keke Rosberg's pole winning Williams-Honda (Rosberg had set the pole at an average of 160.9 mph (258.9 km/h), the fastest ever turbo lap speed). At the Österreichring in Austria he was 11.2 seconds slower than Alain Prost's McLaren TAG-Porsche, while at Monza in Italy he was 8.8 seconds slower than Ayrton Senna's Lotus-Renault.

1986
Martini was replaced in 1986 as the team expanded to running two cars for the fast but crash prone Italian Andrea de Cesaris, and F1 rookie Alessandro Nannini, who showed his class by more often than not out pacing his more experienced countryman and generally was only let down by the underpowered engine and the quality of the M186. This was much to the annoyance of de Cesaris who often demanded to drive Nannini's car feeling it was better than his own and that as the team's lead driver he should get their best car.

AGS only participated in two races during the 1986 season, with Ivan Capelli retiring from both the Italian and Portuguese Grands Prix.

1987
1987 would be the last season the Motori Moderni engine would be used in Formula One. Minardi, who had retained Nannini after an impressive debut season, replaced de Cesaris (who had moved to Brabham) with Spanish driver Adrián Campos who brought considerably more money to the team than driving talent. Once more no points were scored throughout the season, despite some spirited drives by Nannini which only resulted in 11th-placed finishes in Hungary and Portugal. The engines, now rated at  after the introduction of the FIA's mandatory pop-off valve aimed at limiting the turbos power to 4.0 bar, were often struggling against the  V8 Cosworth DFZ powered cars.

At the 1987 Australian Grand Prix in Adelaide, the Motori Moderni had its last ever Formula One race. Nannini qualified an impressive 13th on the grid only 3.434 behind Gerhard Berger's pole winning Ferrari Unfortunately his race only lasted a few hundred metres as he was pushed into the fence just out of the chicane after the start. Campos qualified 26th and last (3.42 seconds slower than Nannini), with his race ending with transmission failure after 46 of the scheduled 82 laps.

With  being the final year for the turbos in Formula One (until ), Motori Moderni pulled out of the sport at the end of 1987 rather than try to adapt the engine for an even lower pop-off valve limit of 2.5 bar and a lower fuel limit of just 150 litres. As a result Minardi were forced to use the Cosworth DFZ engine in 1988.

Subaru
In late 1988 Chiti was commissioned by Subaru to design a new 12-cylinder boxer engine, known as the 1235 for the new 3.5-litre normally aspirated F1 regulations. This was tested by Minardi. The Japanese car company then bought the Coloni team. The program was a complete disaster. In June 1990 Subaru withdrew and sold the team back to Enzo Coloni. The engine found use in the 1989 Jiotto Caspita prototype sports car before it was used by Subaru for the 1990 season.

Sportscar Racing
After abandoning Formula One, the engines found use in the Alba Racing Team's AR20 entry in the 1990 World Sportscar Championship, but were once again unsuccessful.

The engine later saw use in offshore powerboat racing.

Complete Formula One World Championship results
(key) (results in bold indicate pole position; results in italics indicate fastest lap)

 — Driver did not finish the Grand Prix, but was classified as he completed over 90% of the race distance.

References
Profile at GrandPrix.com
Statistics at StatsF1.com

 
Formula One engine manufacturers
Engine manufacturers of Italy